The Fieseler F 4 was developed, built and flown as a two-seat sports and travel aircraft at the Fieseler Flugzeugbau.

Design and development

After the failure of the Fieseler F 3 Wespe, Fieseler developed a sport aircraft with emphasis placed on safety, quality, efficiency, and convenience, designated Fieseler F 4.

The F 4 was a two-seat low-wing monoplane, with a welded steel tube fuselage and wooden wings covered with aircraft linen. The wings, attached to the fuselage, were braced with profile wires from the top of the fuselage and the undercarriage.

Fitted with balloon tires the undercarriage was attachedforward of the centre of gravity, reducing the danger of nose-over during a difficult landing. Fuel  was carried in a gravity tank and transferred using flexible hoses.

Well padded seats in the cockpits with moveable armrests increased comfort and adjustable rudder pedals accommodated pilots of varying heights. A luggage compartment behind the pilot's seat also gave access to controls and equipment in the fuselage.

Initially powered by a  Argus As 16 engine, the F 4 was later powered by a  Salmson 9 AD engine.

Operational history
When it was first flown in  August 1932, Gerhard Fieseler was pleased with F 4's flight characteristics revealed during flight testing despite the low engine power. The targets being confirmed by a number of measurement and test flights.

The F 4 was presented to the public in October 1932 at the German Aerospace Exhibition, offering the aircraft powered by the As 16 at RM 5,900 and RM 6,300 powered by the AD9.

Despite market interest in the F 4, Fieseler had doubts as to the success of the project despite the good market prospects. Flight testing was suspended and production plans abandoned freeing the company to develop new aircraft types.

Specifications (F 4)

References

Further reading

.
 Technische Daten aus Unterlagen des Fieseler Flugzeugbau Kassel

Experimental aircraft
F 4
Single-engined tractor aircraft
1930s German sport aircraft
Aircraft first flown in 1932